Cold porcelain is a crafting material most commonly made from cornstarch and white glue, not from porcelain as its name would suggest. The material can also include small amounts of oils and glycerol. Because most of the constituents are biodegradable, lemon juice or sodium benzoate are sometimes used to prevent the growth of bacteria and fungi. It is most often used for at-home crafting and sculpting due to it drying from air exposure rather than heat curing. The material can also be dissolved by heat or water.

Use recommendations 
Cold porcelain tends to be as plasticine thanks to its composition, consistence, softness, and malleability and after it dries, take an aspect stronger and similar to porcelain, that is the reason because its name has this word. To preserve this material is important to save it in a place where remains hermetically closed. If the material turns a bit dry, it could be soft again if it is mixed with water. This material turns very sticky after mixing it with too much water, to reduce its sticking degree it is recommendable use cornstarch or Vaseline. White glue for manual arts is the most indicated to paste to pieces of cold porcelain.

Colors

To dye cold porcelain, exist three easy ways which are easy, one of them is using oil paint that can be mixed with the amount of material used, and the others are using acrylic paint or using different color powders that are made of different dyes.

Another way to give color to the sculptures or the objects designed in cold porcelain is by means of a painting brush and acrylic paint, because is possible to paint over this material after it is stronger and dry. The colors when cold porcelain is dyed always turns darker when the material dries, and make that it dries faster.

Working tools

Since cold porcelain has a similar consistence like other materials as plasticine the most appropriate working tools are plastic tools or metal and plastic stilettos, scissors, rolling pins and cutters.

See also
 Salt ceramic
 Polymer clay
 Play-Doh

References

External links
 How to make Cold Porcelain
 Consejos básicos para hacer manualidades con porcelana fría | Consumer
 Cold porcelain applications (Spanish)

Sculpture materials
Craft materials